The Testament of Joe Sivers (German: Das Testament des Joe Sivers) is a 1922 German silent film directed by Conrad Wiene and starring Hans Albers, Karl Falkenberg, and Hildegard Imhof.

The film's sets were designed by the art director Karl Machus.

Cast
In alphabetical order
 Hans Albers
 Karl Falkenberg
 Hildegard Imhof
 Friedrich Kühne
 Mara Markow
 Hans Steinbeck
 Sacy von Blondel

References

Bibliography
 Hans-Michael Bock and Tim Bergfelder. The Concise Cinegraph: An Encyclopedia of German Cinema. Berghahn Books, 2009.

External links

1922 films
Films of the Weimar Republic
Films directed by Conrad Wiene
German silent feature films
German black-and-white films
Films based on German novels